Santok  is a village in Gorzów County, Lubusz Voivodeship, in western Poland. It is the seat of the gmina (administrative district) called Gmina Santok.

Geography
The village now has a population of 780.

History
A first fortified settlement at the site was founded in the late 7th century. Santok is mentioned in the 12th century as "barbican and key" to the Polish kingdom at the border with the Duchy of Pomerania in the Gesta principum Polonorum chronicle by Gallus Anonymus. 

Re-established by Bolesław I the Brave in the days of the medieval Piast dynasty, Santok became an important border fortress of Greater Poland and seat of a castellany. An attack by Duke Barnim I of Pomerania in 1251 was repelled. During the 13th century however, the strategically important hill fort became the object of claims raised by the Ascanian margraves of Brandenburg, who intended to enlarge their territories in the Neumark region east of the Oder river. Upon the marriage of Margrave Conrad of Brandenburg-Stendal with Constance, daughter of the deceased Duke Przemysł I of Greater Poland, in 1260, Santok passed to the margraviate as part of her dowry. Once again reconquered by the Polish duke Przemysł II, it finally was incorporated by Brandenburg upon his death in 1296.

The Polish king Casimir III the Great temporarily occupied Santok from 1365; still after his death in 1370, the title of a castellan was awarded by the Polish monarchs until the late 18th century. Within the Brandenburg Neumark region, the fortress lost its importance in favour of nearby Landsberg. It was devastated by Hussite troops in the course of the Polish–Teutonic War in 1433.

In the 18th century, Santok consisted of two ownership shares. One part belonged to the property complex of Frederick Henry, Margrave of Brandenburg-Schwedt and the remainder was owned by the Schöning noble family. During the Seven Years' War, Santok was plundered and destroyed by Russian troops in 1758.

Until 1945, Zantoch belonged to the district of Landsberg in Regierungsbezirk Frankfurt of the Prussian Province of Brandenburg in Germany. Towards the end of World War II, Zantoch was occupied by the Red Army on January 20, 1945. Shortly thereafter, with the implementation of the Oder-Neisse line, Santok was transferred from Germany to Poland, as part of the extensive territorial changes of Poland after World War II. In the following years, the indigenous German population was expelled in accordance with the Potsdam Agreement.

References

Santok
Barbicans

it:Santok